Armitage Bridge is a village approximately  south of Huddersfield, in the Holme Valley, West Yorkshire, England. It is situated between Berry Brow and South Crosland and straddles the River Holme. The village has a public house, a cricket club and a renowned ukulele shop.

Brooke Mill

The village is dominated by the large former woollen mill of John Brooke and Sons, reputedly the oldest family business in the country, having been founded in 1541. The mill has now been converted into the Yorkshire Technology and Office Park.

St Pauls

The local church is St Paul's and it was built in 1848, with a donation from the Brooke family. Partially destroyed in 1987, by fire, and rebuilt in 1990. The church's current clergy is the Rev Julie Anderson.

Gallery

See also
Listed buildings in Huddersfield (Newsome Ward - outer areas)

References

External links

Villages in West Yorkshire
Holme Valley
Geography of Huddersfield